To flight-qualify is to take a product, process, or material and test it in order to prove that it will withstand the environment of aerodynamic or space flight.  This process can include the following tests and processes:
 parts screening
 thermal test
 vacuum test
 vibration test or modal testing
 material analysis

A flight qualification can include a test in the actual desired environment.

References

Spaceflight
Tests